Ian Charleson (11 August 1949 – 6 January 1990) was a Scottish stage and film actor. He is best known internationally for his starring role as Olympic athlete and missionary Eric Liddell in the Oscar-winning 1981 film Chariots of Fire. He is also well known for his portrayal of Rev. Charlie Andrews in the 1982 Oscar-winning film Gandhi.

Charleson was a noted actor on the British stage as well, with critically acclaimed leads in Guys and Dolls, Cat on a Hot Tin Roof, Fool for Love, and Hamlet, among many others. He performed numerous Shakespearean roles, and in 1991 the annual Ian Charleson Awards were established, particularly in honour of his final Hamlet. The awards reward the best classical stage performances in Britain by actors aged under 30.

The Houghton Mifflin Dictionary of Biography describes Charleson as "a leading player of charm and power" and "one of the finest British actors of his generation". Alan Bates wrote that Charleson was "definitely among the top ten actors of his age group". Ian McKellen said Charleson was "the most unmannered and unactorish of actors: always truthful, always honest".

Charleson was diagnosed with HIV in 1986, and died in 1990 at the age of 40. He requested that it be announced after his death that he had died of AIDS, in order to publicise the condition. This was the first celebrity death in the United Kingdom openly attributed to AIDS, and the announcement helped to promote awareness and acceptance of the disease.

Early life

Born in Edinburgh in 1949, Charleson was the son of a printer, and grew up in a working-class area of the city. A bright, musical, artistic child, by the age of eight he was performing in local theatre productions. He won a scholarship to and attended Edinburgh's Royal High School; and in his teens, he joined and performed with The Jasons, an Edinburgh amateur theatrical group. He also sang solo as a boy soprano in church and in the Royal High School choir, which performed on the radio and in Edinburgh Festival concerts.

Charleson won a scholarship to the University of Edinburgh, which he attended from 1967 to 1970, obtaining a three-year Scottish MA Ordinary degree. Initially he studied architecture. However, he spent most of his time acting with the student-run Edinburgh University Drama Society, and decided to pursue acting as a career. He changed his study concentration accordingly, and graduated with a degree in English, fine art, and mathematics. In addition to his acting roles at Edinburgh University, he also directed many plays there, and he designed costumes for several as well.

From 1967 through 1973, Charleson also performed often at the Edinburgh Festival and Edinburgh Festival Fringe, becoming a noted actor in those circles.

Stage career

LAMDA, Young Vic, and Cambridge Theatre Company
After graduating in 1970 from the University of Edinburgh – where he played leads in numerous productions, including several Shakespeare plays – Charleson won a place in the London Academy of Music and Dramatic Art (LAMDA), where he studied for two years.

From LAMDA, Charleson was hired by Frank Dunlop's Young Vic Theatre Company. He made his professional stage debut in 1972 with the Young Vic, as one of the brothers in Joseph and the Amazing Technicolor Dreamcoat (1972), which was also televised in the UK that same year by Granada Television. In 1973, he starred as Jimmy Porter in Look Back in Anger, and that year he was also Hamlet and later Guildenstern in the first revival of Tom Stoppard's Rosencrantz and Guildenstern Are Dead. Also as part of the Young Vic company, he was Claudio in Much Ado About Nothing in 1974. He traveled with the company to the Brooklyn Academy of Music in New York that same year, to appear as Lucentio in The Taming of the Shrew, Ottavio in Scapino, and Brian Curtis in French Without Tears.

In late 1974, he played the title role in Hamlet with the Cambridge Theatre Company, where he had previously performed that year in The School for Scandal and Six Characters in Search of an Author, and the production went on tour into 1975. His performance of Hamlet garnered good reviews; nevertheless Charleson felt he had not done the notoriously difficult role complete justice.

West End and National Theatre debuts, Royal Shakespeare Company
Charleson made his West End debut in 1975, in a long-running production of Simon Gray's Otherwise Engaged at the Queen's Theatre. In it he played Dave, a surly Scottish lodger, opposite Alan Bates.

He next appeared at the National Theatre, where he performed Octavius in Julius Caesar  in 1977. That year he also played Peregrine in the classic play Volpone, opposite John Gielgud, and Captain Phoebus in The Hunchback of Notre Dame.

Charleson then spent a year in Stratford-upon-Avon with the Royal Shakespeare Company 1978–79. There he performed a hauntingly voiced Ariel in The Tempest; Tranio in The Taming of the Shrew; and Longaville in Love's Labour's Lost opposite Richard Griffiths as the King – all both in Stratford and at the Aldwych Theatre in London. Also with the RSC, he was Lawrence Vail in an acclaimed production of Once in a Lifetime (1979) at the Aldwych Theatre, and he played Pierre in the Jane Lapotaire vehicle Piaf, giving a performance which caught the eye of the filmmakers of Chariots of Fire.

National Theatre spotlight

In the 1980s, Charleson won particular critical and popular acclaim for his starring roles at the National Theatre. He was a glowingly reviewed Sky Masterson in Richard Eyre's enormously successful revival of the musical Guys and Dolls (1982), opposite Julie Covington as Sister Sarah, with Bob Hoskins as Nathan Detroit and Julia McKenzie as Adelaide.

Charleson received an Olivier Award nomination for Actor of the Year in a New Play as Eddie in Sam Shepard's gritty and very physical two-person drama, Fool for Love (1984–85), opposite Julie Walters as his on-again off-again love object. And he was a highly praised Brick, the repressed homosexual protagonist in Tennessee Williams' Cat on a Hot Tin Roof (1988), opposite Lindsay Duncan.

Final Hamlet
Shortly before his death, while seriously ill from AIDS, from 9 October to 13 November 1989 Charleson performed his second run of Hamlet, this time at the National Theatre – giving a definitive performance which garnered major accolades. Director Richard Eyre, with some initial misgivings based on Charleson's health, had brought him in to replace Daniel Day-Lewis, who had abandoned the production. A further challenge was that Charleson's face was greatly swollen from septicemia; audience members and the rest of the public were told that he was recovering from a sinus operation.

In a lengthy review praising Charleson's performance, John Peter wrote in the Sunday Times:

The day following Charleson's final Hamlet performance, when Ian McKellen was given the Evening Standard Award for Best Actor for his Iago in Othello, McKellen offered thanks, but said having seen "the perfect Hamlet" at the National Theatre the previous night, he thought that not he but Ian Charleson was truly the Best Actor of 1989, and he gave Charleson his statuette.

Film and television

Chariots of Fire and Gandhi

In 1979, producer David Puttnam and director Hugh Hudson had done months of searching for the actor to play the lead of the evangelical Scot Eric Liddell in their upcoming film about the Olympics. They then saw Charleson performing the role of Pierre in Piaf, and knew immediately they had found their man. Unbeknownst to them, the actor had heard about the film from his father, and desperately wanted to play the part, feeling it would "fit like a kid glove". This mutual affinity led to Charleson's best-known film role and success – as the athlete and missionary Eric Liddell in Chariots of Fire (1981). He prepared for the role by studying the Bible intensively, and he himself wrote Liddell's stirring post-race address to the workingmen's crowd. This film and role made him an international celebrity.

Charleson had a similar success the following year, playing Mahatma Gandhi's closest friend and collaborator, the Anglican priest Charlie Andrews, in Gandhi (1982), opposite Ben Kingsley. Like Chariots of Fire, the film Gandhi won numerous Academy Awards, including Best Picture.

Other film work
After these two major successes in these two Best Picture Oscar–winning films, Charleson's film career did not, however, follow the same progressive arc that his stage career did. Good feature Hollywood scripts did not pour in after Chariots of Fire and Gandhi; nor did he choose to move to Hollywood to capitalize on his success. Also affecting his film career was the fact that he was diagnosed with HIV in 1986, and thereafter lacked enthusiasm to do feature films, although he was not symptomatic until the autumn of 1988. His drive to pursue a rich stage career focusing on Shakespearean leads, however, remained strong.

Charleson's other feature film roles are: punk-era Angel in his film debut Jubilee (1977) directed by Derek Jarman; Lt. Ryder in the Golden Bear-winning "Irish question" film Ascendancy (1982), which starred Julie Covington; a small role as the abusive drunk Jeffson Brown in Greystoke: The Legend of Tarzan (1984); a comedic turn as Gerald Spong in the rather ill-fated Car Trouble (1985), opposite his friend Julie Walters; and opera director Marco in Dario Argento's horror film Opera (1987).

Television: Shakespeare, TV films, and teleplays
Charleson performed in three BBC Television Shakespeare films: as Fortinbras in Hamlet (1980) starring Derek Jacobi; the protagonist Bertram in the acclaimed production of All's Well That Ends Well (1981); and Octavius Caesar in Antony & Cleopatra (1981) opposite his frequent co-star Jane Lapotaire as Cleopatra.

His other notable made-for-television film roles include: the titular Lieutenant Dorfrichter in the film adaptation of M. Fagyas's Austro-Hungarian pre-war mystery The Devil's Lieutenant (1983); Rakitin in Turgenev's A Month in the Country (1985) opposite Eleanor Bron; Kyril in the spy thriller Codename: Kyril (1988) opposite Edward Woodward, Richard E. Grant, and Peter Vaughan; and the protagonist Major Brendan Archer in the faithful screen adaptation of J. G. Farrell's Booker Award-winning Troubles (1988), opposite Ian Richardson.

Charleson's notable starring television roles in the 1970s include: Anthony in A Private Matter (1974), his first starring screen role, opposite Rachel Kempson; slick and cruel John Ross preying on Scottish immigrants to the New World in O Canada (1975) in the anthology series Churchill's People; and one of two British soldiers who find military life nearly unbearable in The Paradise Run (1976), directed by Michael Apted.

In the 1980s his notable starring TV roles included: Alexander the Great's close companion Hephaistion in the PBS miniseries The Search for Alexander the Great; serial killer Neville Heath in an episode of the murder-trial reenactment series Ladykillers (1981); naive Scot turned powerful South African magnate Jamie MacGregor in the miniseries Master of the Game (1984); romantic lead Clarence Dandridge in the period miniseries Louisiana (1984) opposite Margot Kidder; and protagonist Victor Geary in the stylish and clever Oxbridge Blues (1984), written by Frederic Raphael, directed by James Cellan Jones, and co-starring Amanda Redman, Rosalyn Landor, and Malcolm Stoddard.

Singing work
Charleson used his tenor singing voice in musicals and other performances. He did notable solo singing work in productions including Much Ado About Nothing (1974), an episode of Rock Follies of '77 (1977), The Tempest (1978–1979), Piaf (1978–1980), Guys and Dolls (1982), A Royal Night of One Hundred Stars (1985), After Aida (1985–1986), Andrew Lloyd Webber's and Tim Rice's Cricket (1986), Sondheim: A Celebration (1988 benefit for Crusaid), and Bent (1989). He also sang classic standards and show tunes, and the songs of Robert Burns, in variety programmes on stage and television.

Three commercial recordings have been issued that include Charleson's singing:
The National Theatre cast album of Guys and Dolls (1982)
Charleson singing Ariel's Songs from The Tempest, issued by the Royal Shakespeare Company; music by Guy Woolfenden
The Original London Cast Album of Joseph and the Amazing Technicolor Dreamcoat (ensemble only)

He also sings a solo ballad on an episode ("The Empire") of the television series Rock Follies of '77.

Death
Charleson, who was gay, was diagnosed with HIV in 1986 during the AIDS pandemic, and died of AIDS-related causes in January 1990 at the age of 40. He died eight weeks after performing the title role in a run of Hamlet, in Richard Eyre's production at the Olivier Theatre. Fellow actor and friend Ian McKellen said that Charleson played Hamlet so well it was as if he had rehearsed the role all his life.

Charleson requested that it be announced after his death that he had died of AIDS, in order to publicise the condition. This unusual decision by a major internationally known actor, the first show-business death in the United Kingdom openly attributed to complications from AIDS, helped promote awareness of HIV and AIDS and acceptance of AIDS patients.

Honours and commemoration
For his performance in Chariots of Fire, Charleson won a Variety Club Showbiz Award for Most Promising Artiste in February 1982.

He was nominated for the Olivier Award for Actor of the Year in a New Play, for his starring role as Eddie in Fool for Love in 1984.

In The Sunday Times, John Peter named Charleson the Best Male Actor of 1989 for his Hamlet, along with Ian McKellen for his Iago in Othello.

In his honour, the annual Ian Charleson Awards were established in 1991, to reward the best classical stage performances in Britain by actors aged under 30.

The Royal Free Hospital's Ian Charleson Day Centre for people with HIV, in London, is named in his memory.

On 8 April 1990, three months after his Edinburgh funeral, a public memorial service was held for Charleson in London. A recording of his singing of "Come Unto These Yellow Sands" from The Tempest was played.

In 1990, following his death, 20 of Charleson's friends, colleagues, and family members, including Ian McKellen, Alan Bates, Hugh Hudson, Richard Eyre, Sean Mathias, Hilton McRae, Ruby Wax, and David Rintoul, contributed to a book of reminiscences about him, called For Ian Charleson: A Tribute, published in October 1990. All royalties from the sale of the book went to the Ian Charleson Trust, a charitable foundation which operated from 1990 to 2007.

Two emotional reunion performances of Guys and Dolls, with almost all of the original 1982 cast and musicians, were given at the National Theatre in November 1990 as a tribute to Charleson. The tickets sold out immediately, and the dress rehearsal was also packed. The proceeds from the performances were donated to the new HIV clinic at the Royal Free Hospital, and to scholarships in Charleson's name at LAMDA.

Hugh Hudson, who had directed him in Chariots of Fire, dedicated his 1999 film My Life So Far  "In loving memory of Ian Charleson". The 2005 videos "Wings on Their Heels: The Making of Chariots of Fire" and "Chariots of Fire: A Reunion" are both also dedicated to his memory.

Filmography

Major theatre credits

Sources
 Ian McKellen, Alan Bates, Hugh Hudson, et al. For Ian Charleson: A Tribute. London: Constable and Company, 1990.

References

External links

 Bio on Turner Classic Movies
Essay by Alan Bates from For Ian Charleson: A Tribute
Essay by Ian McKellen from For Ian Charleson: A Tribute
Eric Liddell's Chariots of Fire speech written by Ian Charleson himself
Ian Charleson in Britannica online
1994 article by John Peter in the Sunday Times, remembering Charleson's 1989 Hamlet

1949 births
1990 deaths
Male actors from Edinburgh
Alumni of the University of Edinburgh
Alumni of the London Academy of Music and Dramatic Art
People educated at the Royal High School, Edinburgh
Scottish male Shakespearean actors
Scottish male film actors
Scottish male stage actors
Scottish male musical theatre actors
Scottish male television actors
Royal Shakespeare Company members
Edinburgh Festival performers
AIDS-related deaths in England
Scottish gay actors
Ian Charleson Awards
20th-century Scottish male actors
20th-century Scottish male singers